Blue Earth Area High School is a public high school serving grades 8–12.  Its sports teams are called the Buccaneers. It is located in Blue Earth, Minnesota, along U.S. Route 169.

References

External links
 Blue Earth Area High School

Public high schools in Minnesota
Education in Faribault County, Minnesota